"Blaydon Races" (Roud #3511) is a Geordie folk song written in the 19th century by Geordie Ridley, in a style deriving from music hall. It is frequently sung by supporters of Newcastle United Football Club, Newcastle Falcons rugby club, and Durham County Cricket Club.

Stella South Power Station (demolished in 1995) was built on the site of the track in the early 1950s, after the races had stopped taking place in 1916.

Lyrics

The song is quoted from the author's manuscript in Allan's as follows:

Tune: "Brighton".

History

Ridley sang the song at a concert in Balmbra's Music Hall on 5 June 1862. It is likely that on this occasion the song ended with the exhortation to see Ridley's show on 9 June, and that the final verse was added for that later performance. Although the account of the trip to Blaydon is a fiction, the heavy rain and missing cuddy (horses) were reported in the local press.

Places mentioned
"Scotswood Road" was and still is a long road parallel to the left bank of the river Tyne, running westwards from Newcastle city to Benwell and Scotswood, and which at the time of the song ran through industrial and working-class areas. "Airmstrang's factory" was a large engineering works at Elswick, which made large guns and other firearms. The "Robin Adair" was a pub on Scotswood Road which has since been demolished. Paradise is a reference to the small village which stood where the Vickers now stands.

150th anniversary campaign 
In December 2010 an online petition was launched calling for "...a clear and sustained commitment on the part of Newcastle upon Tyne and Gateshead Councils to work hand-in-hand with the Geordie people...to help deliver an appropriate celebration of the 150th anniversary of Mr George Ridley's world-famous anthem of Tyneside."  On 9 November 2011, Chi Onwurah MP presented a parliamentary petition to the Speaker of the House of Commons in support of the campaign.  From August 2011, campaign group members were in discussions with the two councils.  As a result of these discussions, the core campaign objective of delivering an on-street event on the actual anniversary of 9 June 2012 was achieved.  A series of additional "satellite" events were also organised including a week-long beer festival at The Hotspur pub, Percy Street, Newcastle upon Tyne on the night of 9 June 2012.

Modern race 
The Blaydon Race is a 5.9-mile athletics race from Newcastle to Blaydon that takes place on 9 June every year and starts off with the singing of 'The Blaydon Races', as the words are used as the basis for the whole race.

Other uses 
 "Blaydon Races" is often used as a chant by supporters of Newcastle United Football Club.

 The song was adopted as its marching anthem by the British Army Infantry soldiers of the Fifth of Foot (The Royal Northumberland Fusiliers), of Fenham Barracks, Newcastle upon Tyne. Today it is the Regimental Song of The Royal Regiment of Fusiliers, the modern descendants of The Royal Northumberland Fusiliers.

 In November 2009 a charity version of 'Blaydon Races' was recorded by Jimmy Nail, Kevin Whately and Tim Healy, from the cast of  Auf Wiedersehen, Pet, in aid of the Sir Bobby Robson Foundation, featuring an additional verse about him.

 William Irving's 1903 painting. 'The Blaydon Races – A Study from Life' is on show at the Shipley Art Gallery in Gateshead. The painting depicts the fairground festivities associated with the race.

Recordings
 The Friends of Fiddler's Green on The Road to Mandalay, 1994
 Bob Davenport and The Marsden Rattlers, released in 1971 on "BBC's Folk on 2 presents Northumbrian Folk" (BBC Records REC 118S [LP, UK, 1971])
 In the opening scenes of The Lone Ranger (2013) the song playing in the background on an organ is "The Blaydon Races"

See also 
Geordie dialect words

Notes

External links
Blaydon Races 1962 Centenary

English folk songs
Football songs and chants
Songs related to Newcastle upon Tyne
1862 songs
Northumbrian folklore
Scotswood